Francisco "Paco" Flores Lajusticia (born 26 November 1952) is a Spanish retired football forward and coach.

His career was closely associated with Espanyol, as both a player and manager.

Playing career
Born in Barcelona, Catalonia, Flores was brought up at hometown's RCD Español, being loaned several times during his contract, exclusively in his native region. Subsequently, after having been re-signed from Real Jaén, he played three La Liga seasons for his main club, scoring eight goals in 33 matches in his first to help the Pericos to the 14th position, just one point above the relegation zone. He made his debut in the competition on 3 September 1977 at the age of 25, in a 3–1 away loss against Sevilla FC; on 20 November, he netted a late equaliser for the hosts in a 1–1 derby draw against FC Barcelona.

In January 1981, after another stint with Jaén, Flores signed for Linares CF in Segunda División, but suffered a car accident which nearly cost him the loss of one eye shortly after, leaving the club at the end of his second season, aged 29. Before retiring, he played a couple of years with amateurs FC Santboià, in Catalonia.

Coaching career
Flores took up coaching in 1984, spending one full decade with Español's youth teams (Espanyol from 1995 onwards). He progressed to the B-team in 1994, helping them promote to Segunda División B in his first season.

Flores was appointed first-team manager with 14 games to go in the 1996–97 campaign, replacing fired Vicente Miera and leading Espanyol to the 12th position. He then returned to the reserves for two further seasons.

Flores again came to the rescue of the club's main squad midway through 1999–2000, occupying the position of dismissed Miguel Ángel Brindisi. He managed to lead the team out of relegation (14th place), adding the conquest of the club's third Copa del Rey – against Atlético Madrid – the first in 60 years, and remained at the helm for a further two full years.

In 2002–03, Flores accepted a new challenge with Real Zaragoza, helping the Aragonese return to the top level after one year and being replaced by Víctor Muñoz after the 20th round in the following season, which also ended with Spanish Cup win. After 11 second level games with UD Almería in the 2004–05 campaign, he was in charge of the Andalusians for the full 2005–06, leading them to the sixth position. 

Flores returned to the top flight in 2006–07, replacing Luis César Sampedro at Gimnàstic de Tarragona in late November 2006, following a 3–2 home loss against RCD Mallorca. Even though he improved on his predecessor's numbers, it was not good enough to avoid relegation.

Honours
Espanyol
Copa del Rey: 1999–2000

References

External links

1952 births
Living people
Footballers from Barcelona
Spanish footballers
Association football forwards
La Liga players
Segunda División players
Segunda División B players
Tercera División players
RCD Espanyol B footballers
RCD Espanyol footballers
CE Sabadell FC footballers
UE Sant Andreu footballers
Girona FC players
Real Jaén footballers
Linares CF players
FC Santboià players
La Liga managers
Segunda División managers
Segunda División B managers
RCD Espanyol managers
UD Almería managers
Real Zaragoza managers
Gimnàstic de Tarragona managers
Spanish football managers
RCD Espanyol B managers